Ethnic cleansing in Bhutan refers to a series of violences to remove the Lhotshampa, or ethnic Nepalis, from Bhutan. Inter-ethnic tensions in Bhutan have resulted in the flight of many Lhotshampa to Nepal, many of whom have been expelled by the Bhutanese military. By 1996, over 100,000 Bhutanese refugees (17% of Bhutan's population at the time) were living in refugee camps in Nepal. Many have since resettled in Western nations.

Background: Lhotshampa people 

The Lhotshampa or Lhotsampa population is a heterogeneous Bhutanese people of Nepalese descent. People of Nepalese origin began to settle in uninhabited areas in southern Bhutan in the 19th century. The Lhotshampa people are native to southern Bhutan and are therefore commonly referred to as 'Southerners'. As of 2007, much of the Lhotshampa population has been forcefully relocated to Western nations, such as the United States, Canada, Australia, the United Kingdom, and other European countries after facing expulsion policies from the Bhutanese government. Today, the number of Lhotshampa in Nepal is significantly less than in the United States and other countries where they have relocated. No refugees have been allowed to return to Bhutan despite negotiations taking place.

Expulsion and migration 
Since the late 1980s, more than 100,000 Lhotshampa have been forced out of Bhutan after being labeled illegal aliens by Bhutanese authorities. During the 1980s, the Lhotshampa population constituted 25% of Bhutan’s total population, with the migration of these citizens from Nepal to Bhutan first beginning in the mid-nineteenth century. Between 1988 and 1993, thousands of others left the country due to ethnic and political oppression. In 1990, violent ethnic unrest and anti-government protests erupted in southern Bhutan, demanding greater democracy and respect for minority rights. That year, the Bhutan Peoples' Party, whose members are mostly Lhotshampa, launched a campaign of violence against the Bhutanese government. The Lhotshampa faced a brutal response from the government, which included the raping of women and citizens being captured, jailed, and tortured. This included human rights activists, teachers, and political leaders. In the wake of this unrest and violence, thousands of people fled Bhutan, settling in Nepal's seven refugee camps or leaving to find work in India. 

The Bhutan Citizenship Act of 1985 also played a large role in the displacement of the Lhotshampa. The act introduced new requirements on who could be designated as a Bhutanese citizen, and mainly affected ethnic Nepali who were largely Lhotshampa. The act declared that in order to be considered a citizen, one’s parents must both be Bhutanese, which heavily affected the Lhotshampa population. As of January 2010, 85,544 refugees remained in camps. In 2008, the US State Department estimated that as much as 35% of the population of Bhutan had been displaced as a result of these conflicts. 

Prior to expulsion, the Lhotshampa had held major roles within the Bhutanese government, which included serving as bureaucrats, police officers, and in the army. 

Although many Lhotshampa fled to India, they were met with very little support from the local Indian government, which allowed the Bhutanese army to commit larger acts of violence against the Lhotshampa. Nepal proved to be more receptive to the population and eventually engaged in discussions with Bhutan to try and repatriate the Lhotshampa starting in April 1993. However, these talks only resulted in the new categorization of Lhotshampa refugees. They were broken into four categories, consisting of Bhutanese who had been evicted, Bhutanese who had emigrated, Bhutanese with criminal records, and non-Bhutanese people. This was done as a tactic by Bhutan to prevent the Lhotshampa from re-entering the country by removing their citizenship rights, which included pressuring Lhotshampa to sign forms that stated that they had voluntarily left Bhutan.

Results of Ethnic Cleansing in Bhutan

Resettlement Outside Bhutan 
Countries that have stated they are willing to grant asylum to Bhutanese refugees include The Netherlands, Australia, New Zealand, Finland, Canada, Norway, and the United States. The United States specifically stated that it would be willing to allow up to 60,000 refugees to enter its borders, although it was also considering sending the migrants back to their home country. The UNHCR estimates that around 113,000 refugees resettled in these countries, although in 2018 the agency closed the resettlement program that it had in Nepal. This resulted in far fewer Bhutanese refugees being admitted into countries including the United States specifically. The United States alone resettled 84,819 refugees as of 2015. Although 2228 refugees were granted admission to the United States in 2018, only 19 were granted the same status in the first seven months of 2019.

Bhutanese refugees in the United States typically have difficulty resettling, with 65 percent living within 200 percent of the US federal poverty level. Half of Bhutanese refugees within the United States are unemployed and half do not possess a high school degree.

Refugee Camps 
Bhutanese refugee camps possess substandard living conditions. A 1994 study found that the crude mortality rate in these camps was 1.15 deaths per year for every 10 people. Cholera, malaria, dysentery, and other diseases are also present within these camps.

Mental Health 
Death by suicide is nearly twice as common among Bhutanese refugees that resettle within the United States as it is for the general US population. In a sample of fifteen refugees, 46.7% of the sample population had known someone personally that had died as a result of suicide. This sample further reported that the largest factor contributing to suicides among Bhutanese refugees were "postmigration stressors", with other factors playing a part such as "social/familial discord" and "isolation, thwarted belongingness".

References

External links 

 

Hinduism in Bhutan
Ethnic cleansing in Asia
Human rights in Bhutan
Persecution of Hindus
Ethnic groups in Bhutan
 
Society of Bhutan
Anti-immigration politics in Asia